James Jerome Woods (born September 17, 1939), nicknamed "Woody", is an American former professional baseball player. He played parts of three seasons in Major League Baseball, primarily as a third baseman.

Woods' eight-year (1957–64) professional career included parts of three seasons with the Chicago Cubs (1957) and Philadelphia Phillies (1960–61), but he spent portions or all of those eight seasons toiling in minor league baseball. In the majors, he appeared in 36 games, collecting 17 hits, including three doubles and three home runs.

Woods was included in a notable trade between the Cubs and Phillies on January 11, 1960, when he was packaged with veteran shortstop Alvin Dark and pitcher John Buzhardt in a trade for the Phillies' veteran center fielder (and future Hall of Famer) Richie Ashburn.

Notes

References 

Major League Baseball third basemen
Chicago Cubs players
Philadelphia Phillies players
Burlington Bees players
Fort Worth Cats players
Lancaster Red Roses players
Indianapolis Indians players
Dallas Rangers players
Jacksonville Suns players
Rochester Red Wings players
Arkansas Travelers players
Rocky Mount Leafs players
Macon Peaches players
1939 births
Living people
Baseball players from Chicago